The following is a list of the Admirals of the Imperial Japanese Navy during its existence from 1868 until 1945.

Marshal Admirals
.

Admirals
.

Vice Admirals

Rear Admirals
.

References

Admirals
Japan